In differential geometry a translation surface is a surface that is generated by translations: 
By this procedure curve  generates a surface: the translation surface.

If both curves are contained in a common plane, the translation surface is planar (part of a plane). This case is generally ignored.

Simple examples:

Translation surfaces are popular in descriptive geometry and architecture, because they can be modelled easily. 
In differential geometry minimal surfaces are represented by translation surfaces or as midchord surfaces (s. below).

The translation surfaces as defined here should not be confused with the translation surfaces in complex geometry.

Parametric representation 
(TS) 
and contains the origin. Therefore, both curves are called generatrices (one: generatrix).

If the precondition  is not fulfilled, the surface defined by (TS) may not contain the origin and the curves . But in any case the surface contains shifted copies of any of the curves  as parametric curves  and  respectively.

The two curves  can be used to generate the so called corresponding midchord surface. Its parametric representation is
 (MCS)

Helicoid as translation surface and midchord surface 

A helicoid is a special case of a generalized helicoid and a ruled surface. It is an example of a minimal surface and can be represented as a translation surface.
 
The helicoid with the parametric representation 
 
has a turn around shift (German: Ganghöhe) . 
Introducing new parameters  such that

and  a positive real number, one gets a new parametric representation 
 

which is the parametric representation of a translation surface with the two identical (!) generatrices
 and

The (identical) generatrices are helices with the turn around shift  which lie on the cylinder with the equation . Any parametric curve is a shifted copy of the generatrix  (in diagram: purple) and is contained in the right circular cylinder with radius , which contains the z-axis.
 
The new parametric representation represents only such points of the helicoid that are within the cylinder with the equation .

From the new parametric representation one recognizes, that the helicoid is a midchord surface, too:

 
where 
 and 
 
are two identical generatrices.

Advantages of a translation surface 

 Architecture
A surface (for example a roof) can be manufactured using a jig for curve
 and several identical jigs of curve .  The jigs can be designed without any knowledge of mathematics. By positioning the jigs the rules of a translation surface have to be respected only.

 Descriptive geometry 
Establishing a parallel projection of a translation surface one 1) has to produce projections of the two generatrices, 2) make a jig of curve   and 3) draw with help of this jig copies of the curve respecting the rules of a translation surface. The contour of the surface is the envelope of the curves drawn with the jig.  This procedure works for orthogonal and oblique projections, but not for central projections.

 Differential geometry
For a translation surface with parametric representation

This is an essential facilitation for showing that (for example) a helicoid is a minimal surface.

References 

 G. Darboux: Leçons sur la théorie générale des surfaces et ses applications géométriques du calcul infinitésimal , 1–4 , Chelsea, reprint, 972, pp. Sects. 81–84, 218
 Georg Glaeser: Geometrie und ihre Anwendungen in Kunst, Natur und Technik, Springer-Verlag, 2014, p. 259
 W. Haack: Elementare Differentialgeometrie, Springer-Verlag, 2013, p. 140
 C. Leopold: Geometrische Grundlagen der Architekturdarstellung. Kohlhammer Verlag, Stuttgart 2005, p. 122
 D.J. Struik: Lectures on classical differential geometry , Dover, reprint ,1988,  pp. 103, 109, 184

External links 
 Encyclopedia of Mathematics

Surfaces
Differential geometry
Differential geometry of surfaces
Analytic geometry